Chahar Taq (also Romanized as Chahār Ţāq) is a village in Qaleh Juq Rural District, Anguran District, Mahneshan County, Zanjan Province, Iran. At the 2006 census, its population was 121, in 24 families.

References 

Populated places in Mahneshan County